Metacrias strategica is a species of moth in the family Erebidae. This species is endemic to New Zealand where it is known from the southern part of the South Island. The female of the species is flightless and pale brown, grey or yellowish-brown in colour where as the male is brightly coloured and flies during the day.

Taxonomy
This species was first described by George Hudson in 1889 using specimens obtained from William Walter Smith and named Arctia strategica. Smith took the holotype specimen in February near the summit of the Richardson Range in South Canterbury by beating Carmichaelia australis. George Hudson discussed and illustrated this species in his 1898 publication New Zealand moths and butterflies (Macro-lepidoptera), and again in his 1928 book The Butterflies and Moths of New Zealand. In both those publications he used the name Metacrias strategica, following the assignment of the species to that genus by Edward Meyrick in 1890. In 1914 Charles Rothschild proposed the subspecies Metacrias strategica hudsoni, however this was synonymised by John S. Dugdale in 1988. The holotype specimen is held at the Museum of New Zealand Te Papa Tongarewa.

Description
Adults males are brightly coloured and diurnal, while females are pale brown, grey or yellowish-brown in colour.

Hudson described the species as follows:

Distribution

M. strategica is endemic to New Zealand. It is known from the southern part of the South Island. It has been recorded in Otatara and at Waituna where it inhabits coastal silver tussock patches at the back of the shingle beach. Other sites in Southland include Brydone, Cannibal Bay, Waipapa Point and Sandy Point.

Biology and behaviour

The larvae are polyphagous on grasses and herbs. They are hairy and are variable in colour, ranging from straw yellow to deep brown. The larvae appear to overwinter in the larval and pupal stages, the adults having only a very brief life span of approximately 21 days confined to the summer months. Early instars feed during warm periods. The last larval instar lives in the cold winter months of June to August and is inactive and overwinters until warmer spring weather occurs. Because of individual variations in the duration of the larval instars, pupae too may overwinter. Cocoons are attached to wood and will only rarely be under stones if there is no other ground cover.

Although the females are flightless and tend to stay in their cocoon to bred and lay eggs, some females, after they pupate, have been show to leave and move a short distance from their nest. However main population disbursal is as a result of larvae movement.

Habitat and host species
This species is found in coastal and forest-edge sites up to the montane zone. The larvae have been observed feeding on European grasses, clover, species in the genera Acaena and Crepis, dandelion, plantain, and the endemic species Bulbinella hookeri. Other species consumed by the larvae include Gentiana bellidifolia, Senecio bellidioides, and Muehlenbeckia complexia.

References

External links
 Holotype specimen of Metacrias strategica

Spilosomina
Moths of New Zealand
Endemic fauna of New Zealand
Moths described in 1889
Taxa named by George Hudson
Endemic moths of New Zealand